Martin Steger (born 20 October 1948) is a former Swiss cyclist. He competed in the team pursuit event at the 1972 Summer Olympics.

References

External links
 

1948 births
Living people
Swiss male cyclists
Olympic cyclists of Switzerland
Cyclists at the 1972 Summer Olympics
Place of birth missing (living people)